The Independent Manchester United Supporters Association (IMUSA) is an organisation linked to Manchester United football club, based in Manchester, England.

The group is independent of the club. Its primary aim is to represent the interests of the club's supporters, and facilitate lines of communication between the supporters and the directors of the club. The organisation was formed at a meeting at the Gorse Hill Hotel in Stretford in April 1995 as a protest group against official club policies regarding standing during matches.

The group have been opposed to foreign ownership of the club, opposing both the unsuccessful takeover attempt by Rupert Murdoch, and the later successful takeover by the current owners, the Glazer family. The group has also opposed rising ticket prices which they believe make the club's games inaccessible to the "true" owners, the supporters.

Notable members
 Roger Taylor, of the band Queen, donated £10,000.

References

External links
IMUSA website

Manchester United F.C.
English football supporters' associations